Have You Forgotten? is the first compilation album by American country music singer Darryl Worley. It was released on April 15, 2003 via DreamWorks Records Nashville. The album contains material from his first two albums, including four new songs, the title track, "I Will Hold My Ground", "I Need a Breather" and "Shiloh". The title track spent seven weeks at number one on the Hot Country Songs charts in 2003. Also released from this album were "Tennessee River Run" (previously found on his album I Miss My Friend) and "I Will Hold My Ground", the latter of which failed to make top 40. This album was certified gold by the RIAA. This CD is in HDCD format, providing improved audio quality on compatible players.

Track listing
"Have You Forgotten?" (Wynn Varble, Darryl Worley) – 4:03
"I Will Hold My Ground" (Worley, Frank Rogers) – 4:03
"POW 369" (Steven Dale Jones) – 3:43
"I Need a Breather" (Steve Leslie, Worley) – 3:38
"Back Where I Belong" (Randy Hardison, Leslie, Worley) – 3:20
"Those Less Fortunate Than I" (Mark Nesler) – 3:57
"Shiloh" (Don Poythress, Varble, Worley) – 4:24
"Tennessee River Run" (Leslie, Worley) – 3:23
"The Least That You Can Do" (Walt Aldridge, Worley) – 4:04
"I Miss My Friend" (Tom Shapiro, Nesler, Tony Martin) – 4:02
"Family Tree" (Darrell Scott) – 3:21
"A Good Day to Run" (Bobby Tomberlin, Worley) – 3:08
"Second Wind" (Leslie, Worley) – 4:24
"When You Need My Love" (Varble, Worley) – 3:39
"Too Many Pockets" (Leslie, Worley) – 2:52
"The Way Things Are Goin'" (Mark D. Sanders, Worley) – 3:46

Personnel
As listed in liner notes.

 Eddie Bayers – drums
 Larry Beaird – acoustic guitar
 Mike Brignardello – bass guitar
 Jim "Moose" Brown – piano, Hammond B-3 organ, keyboards
 J. T. Corenflos – electric guitar
 Melodie Crittenden – background vocals
 Eric Darken – percussion
 Glen Duncan – fiddle, mandolin
 Paul Franklin – steel guitar
 Carl Gorodetzky – violin on "Shiloh"
 Kevin "Swine" Grantt – bass guitar
 Randy Hardison – drums, percussion
 Aubrey Haynie – fiddle, mandolin
 Wes Hightower – background vocals
 John Hobbs – piano
 Rob Ickes – dobro
 Kirk "Jellyroll" Johnson – harmonica
 Mike Johnson – steel guitar
 Bob Mason – cello on "Shiloh"
 Brent Mason – electric guitar, six-string bass guitar, baritone guitar, gut string guitar
 Steve Nathan – piano, Wurlitzer electric piano, keyboards
 Frank Rogers – electric guitar, keyboards
 Manny Rogers – laughing on "Family Tree"
 Matt Rollings – piano, Hammond B-3 organ
 Brent Rowan – electric guitar
 Pam Sixfin – viola on "Shiloh"
 James Stroud – drums
 Bryan Sutton – acoustic guitar, mandolin, banjo
 Biff Watson – acoustic guitar
 Bergen White – violin on "Shiloh"
 Kris Wilkinson – viola on "Shiloh"
 Brian David Willis – percussion
 Glenn Worf – bass guitar
 Darryl Worley – lead vocals
 Curtis Wright – background vocals

Strings on "I Miss My Friend" performed by the Nashville String Machine. All strings arranged by Bergen White.

Charts

Weekly charts

Year-end charts

References

2003 albums
DreamWorks Records albums
Darryl Worley albums
Albums produced by Frank Rogers (record producer)
Albums produced by James Stroud